Kennett is a surname. Notable people with the surname include:

 Barney Kennett (born 1955), English speedway rider
 Basil Kennett (1674–1715), English cleric, college president
 Bob Kennett (fl. 1967–1970), New Zealand-American racing car driver
 Brackley Kennett (fl. 1765–1781), English Sheriff & Lord Mayor of London
 Brady Kennett (born 1974), New Zealander racing car driver
 Brian Kennett (born 1948), English-Australian seismologist
 Kennett Bros (fl. 1986–2014), New Zealand mountain bikers, event organisers, authors
 Edward Kennett (born 1986), British speedway rider
 Fred Kennett (1908–1994), Australian rules football player
 Gordon Kennett (born 1953), British speedway rider
 Houn Jiyu-Kennett (1924–1996), English rōshi
 Jeff Kennett (born 1948), Australian politician
 Luther Martin Kennett (1807–1873), US politician
 Muriel Kennett Wales (1913–2009), Irish-Canadian mathematician
 Murray Kennett (born 1952), Canadian hockey player
 Paul Kennett (fl. 1992), British rugby league footballer
 Rick Kennett (born 1956), Australian author
 Robert Hatch "R.H." Kennett (1864–1932) English professor of Hebrew 
 Todd P. Kennett (born 1969), US rowing coach
 White Kennett (1660–1728), English bishop, antiquarian

The name has also been used as a given name
 William Kennett Loftus (1820–1858), English geologist, naturalist, explorer, archaeological excavator
 Kennett Love (1924–2013), US journalist
 John Kennett Starnes (1918–2014),  Canadian civil servant, diplomat, novelist.